Zion Episcopal Church is a historic Episcopal church in Palmyra, Wayne County, New York.  It was designed in a Late Gothic Revival style by Emlyn T. Littel and was built in 1872.  It is built of Medina sandstone with limestone trim.  Its roof features polychrome slate shingles.

It was listed on the National Register of Historic Places in 1996.  In 2009, it was included in the Palmyra Village Historic District.

References

External links
 Zion Episcopal Church website

Churches on the National Register of Historic Places in New York (state)
Episcopal church buildings in New York (state)
Churches in Wayne County, New York
Gothic Revival church buildings in New York (state)
Churches completed in 1872
19th-century Episcopal church buildings
National Register of Historic Places in Wayne County, New York